Turris ruthae is a species of sea snail, a marine gastropod mollusk in the family Turridae, the turrids.

Description
The length of this species varies between 38 mm and 57 mm.

Distribution
This marine species occurs off Natal, South Africa.

References

 Steyn, D. G.; Lussi, M. (2005). Offshore Shells of Southern Africa: A pictorial guide to more than 750 Gastropods. Published by the authors. pp. i–vi, 1–289.
 Kilburn R.N., Fedosov A.E. & Olivera B.M. (2012) Revision of the genus Turris Batsch, 1789 (Gastropoda: Conoidea: Turridae) with the description of six new species. Zootaxa 3244: 1-58.

External links
 Kilburn, R.N. (1983) Turridae (Mollusca: Gastropoda) of southern Africa and Mozambique. Part 1. Subfamily Turrinae. Annals of the Natal Museum, 25, 549–585.

ruthae
Gastropods described in 1983